RAF Riccall is a former Royal Air Force airfield located  north east of Selby, North Yorkshire and  south west of Elvington, North Yorkshire, England.

History
The airfield was opened in September 1942 as a satellite to RAF Marston Moor. The technical site consisted of six T2 hangars and one B1 hangar.

During October 1942, No. 76 and No. 80 Conversion Flights (along with No. 10 Conversion Flight from another airfield) joined together to make No. 1658 Heavy Conversion Unit RAF.

The following units were based at the airfield:
 No. 35 Maintenance Unit RAF.
 No. 91 Maintenance Unit RAF.
 No. 261 Maintenance Unit RAF.
 No. 268 Maintenance Unit RAF.
 No. 939 (West Riding) Balloon Squadron AAF.
 No. 1332 (Transport) Heavy Conversion Unit RAF.
 No. 1341 (Special Duties) Flight RAF.
 Airborne Forces Experimental Establishment.
 York & District Flying Group.

After 1945, flying ceased, although the site was used as storage until 1958. The south west side of the airfield and storage area is now part of Skipwith Common National Nature Reserve. Part of the site was also used for mining coal as part of the Selby Coalfield operation between the 1980s and 2004.

Current use
The site is now used for farming.

References

Sources

External links
 Atlantik Wall - RAF Riccall
 Image of RAF Riccall from 1947

Royal Air Force stations of World War II in the United Kingdom
Royal Air Force stations in Yorkshire